George D.B. Butterfield  D.F.A. (born February 5, 1939) is a Canadian businessperson and philanthropist.

Born in Saint John, New Brunswick and raised in Bermuda, he received a Bachelor of Arts degree from the Trinity College, Toronto in 1961 and a Bachelor of Law from Osgoode Hall Law School in 1965. During his final year at the University of Toronto, he was elected president of the Kappa Alpha Literary Society. A Bermuda citizen as well, he was elected a Rhodes Scholar in Bermuda in 1963 but resigned.

Starting his career as a lawyer, along with his wife Martha and her brother Sidney Robinson, he co-founded Butterfield & Robinson  in 1966, to offer biking trips for students around Europe. Today, it is a luxury active travel company with about 100 biking, walking, and boating trips in more than two dozen countries. Butterfield & Robinson grew to become one of the best-known specialty travel companies in North America and, by 2009, employed 40 full-time staff and 150 guides.  Butterfield retired from the day-to-day operations of Butterfield & Robinson in 2009.

A philanthropist, he has worked with the Ontario College of Art and Design as the chairperson of its capital campaign which raised forty million dollars. The OCAD presented him an honorary doctorate in 2007. He was also involved with PEN Canada, Canadian Paraplegic Association, and the World Wildlife Fund Canada.

In 2006, he was made an Officer of the Order of Canada.

References
 
 
 

1939 births
Living people
Businesspeople from Ontario
Businesspeople from Saint John, New Brunswick
Officers of the Order of Canada
Canadian Rhodes Scholars
Trinity College (Canada) alumni
University of Toronto alumni
York University alumni
Osgoode Hall Law School alumni